Mohamed Al-Yami (born 15 May 1980) is a Saudi Arabian sprinter. He competed in the men's 4 × 100 metres relay at the 2000 Summer Olympics.

References

1980 births
Living people
Athletes (track and field) at the 2000 Summer Olympics
Saudi Arabian male sprinters
Olympic athletes of Saudi Arabia
Place of birth missing (living people)